Cyclostrema japonicum is a species of sea snail, a marine gastropod mollusk, in the family Liotiidae.

Distribution
This species occurs in Amami Island.

References

Liotiidae